Live Noise is a 1998 live album by Canadian band Moxy Früvous, their only major-label live album.  Material on the album includes songs from all of their studio albums (with minor lyrical changes on some songs), along with three covers and witty banter from the shows.  It is a compilation of several recordings over the course of 1997.

Track listing
"Michigan Militia" – 3:30 {p}
"Jockey Full o'Bourbon"  – 3:06 (by Tom Waits) {p}
"Intra-Pennsylvania Rivalry" – 1:21 {p}
"Horseshoes" – 4:24 {p}
"Good Date Band?" – 1:28 {p}
"Fly" – 5:23 {n}
"Boo Time" – 3:52 {b}
"Kirk King Intro" – 0:44 {n}
"King of Spain" – 3:14 {b}
"Lowest Highest Point* [Improv]" – 3:10 {r}
"B.J. Don't Cry" – 3:21 {n}
"Johnny Saucep'n" – 1:27 {b}
"Nature Sounds" – 0:49 {n}
"I've Gotta Get a Message to You" – 3:24 (Bee Gees cover, by Barry Gibb/Robin Gibb/Maurice Gibb) {p}
"My Baby Loves a Bunch of Authors" – 2:49 {n}
"Naked Puppets" - 1:02 {n}
"No No Raja" - 3:02 {n}
"Video Bargainville" - 4:10 {b}
"Kasparov vs. Deep Blue" - 3:27 {^}
"Psycho Killer" - 4:27 (Talking Heads cover, by David Byrne# [sic]) {n}
"Losers" - 0:09 {b}
"King of Spain [Cranky Monarch Version]" - 5:18 {b}
"The Drinking Song" - 6:05 (contains elements from the Lead Belly  song "Goodnight, Irene", by Huddie Ledbetter and John A. Lomax) {b}

All songs by Moxy Früvous except where noted.  City code {Philadelphia=p, New York=n, Buffalo=b, Providence=r}, where the track was recorded, is in curly brackets.

*The debate over which state has "The Lowest Highest Point" is often disputed, and the state with the lowest highest point is incorrectly given as Delaware, when in fact, it is Florida.  The reason for this mistake is reportedly from a misunderstanding of an answer in the game Trivial Pursuit, in which the question was, "Which state has the lowest mean elevation", to which Delaware is the correct answer.
^This track has an unclear recording location, but it appears to have been recorded at the Massachusetts Institute of Technology in Boston, Massachusetts on May 17, 1997.
#The liner notes only show Byrne as the composer, but the song was composed by David Byrne, Chris Frantz, and Tina Weymouth.

References

External links
Official site with liner notes and lyrics
Fruhead.com: Fan site for all things Moxy Früvous
[ Allmusic.com site]

Moxy Früvous albums
1998 live albums